Eric Allaman is an American composer who has worked in film, television, theater and ballet.  His career began when he co-composed the score to Ridley Scott's Legend with the German electronic group Tangerine Dream. That opportunity led to Eric re-scoring the silent classic, Battleship Potemkin which was re-released in Europe and featured at the Berlin Film Festival.

Life and career
Born in Springfield, Missouri, Allaman's family moved around the Midwest and eventually settled in Dana Point, California. Allaman began studying the piano at age 7, the guitar at age 16, and continued his studies at UCLA with an emphasis on music and theater.

Shortly after graduating, Allaman moved to Paris, France and ultimately West Berlin, Germany to further his musical career. Allaman hooked up with Reinhard Scheuregger and the two became Berlin Game.  The duo scored four films, Legend (1985 film), Battleship Potemkin, Down Twisted, Angel III: The Final Chapter, and released one album, Berlin Game.  After the success of Legend and Battleship Potemkin, Berlin Game (Allaman & Scheuregger) returned to Los Angeles to field film scoring offers. After the WGA strike in 1988, Allaman and Scheuregger separated ways and Allaman began working under his own name.  He has scored 43 movies and over 600 episodes of television shows and is best known for his scores to Legend, Battleship Potemkin, Latter Days, Witless Protection, Mike Hammer Private Eye, Extreme Makeover: Home Edition and Dante's Cove.  Allaman won a BMI television award for his work with Extreme Makeover: Home Edition in 2006.

Allaman has written four musicals, including Zeitelmoos - Im Bann Anderer Mächte with Hartmut H. Forche (2022), Wake Up with Bob Garrett (2020), Battleship Potemkin with Jeffrey Couchman (1991), and Voices from the Cellar with Robert White (1989). Allaman has written three ballets with Kim Maselli (Artistic Director of the Pacific Festival Ballet), Camelot (2019), Noah's Ark (2010), and The Sea Princess (2007).  He has also written the music to several plays, including The Geography of Luck, Dragon Lady, Stendhal, and Relay.  Allaman has released two collections of piano solos. What We Whispered is a selection of pieces composed during the COVID-19 pandemic and was released in 2022. His first solo piano album, Berlin Diary, was released in 2010 and plays as a memoir of his life in West Berlin.

Eric was a Professor for Pepperdine University teaching Scoring Visual Media from 2014-2018.

Personal life
Allaman has two sons, Von Essex and Tristian Leif from his first marriage that ended in 2005.  He lives with his domestic partner, celebrity chef, Elizabeth Clune.  He is an active surfer and skier and currently lives in The Sea Ranch, California.

Professional credits

Television

Film

Musical Theatre, Theatre, and Dance

Soundtracks

References

External links 
 EricAllaman.com
 

Living people
American male composers
21st-century American composers
Year of birth missing (living people)
People from Dana Point, California
Musicians from California
21st-century American male musicians